Kinninvie is a hamlet in County Durham, England. It is situated to the north of Barnard Castle.  Kinninvie is in the civil parish of Marwood.

References

Villages in County Durham